Hubert Gabrielse (born March 1, 1926) is a Canadian retired geologist who formerly worked for the Geological Survey of Canada. He devoted much of his more than 50 years in geosciences to regional geological mapping in the northern Cordillera of British Columbia, southeast Yukon and southwest District of Mackenzie. His work has led to syntheses of the geological evolution of the northern Cordillera range.

Gabrielse published several papers with Stewart Blusson in the late 1960s. He was a contributor to Lithoprobe.

One of the volcanoes found in the Tuya Volcanic Field is named after him, Gabrielse Cone.

Awards
1990, awarded the Ambrose Medal by the Geological Association of Canada
2000, awarded the Logan Medal by the Geological Association of Canada

See also
Rocky Mountain Trench

References

External links
Geological Survey of Canada Bio
List of Gabrielse’s publications
Lithoprobe publications

1926 births
Possibly living people
Canadian geologists
Geological Survey of Canada personnel
Logan Medal recipients